Pectolase may refer to one of two enzymes:
Pectin lyase
Polygalacturonase